is a Japanese light novel series written by Nagaru Tanigawa and illustrated by Noizi Ito. It was first published in 2003 by Kadokawa Shoten in Japan with the novel The Melancholy of Haruhi Suzumiya, and has since been followed by 11 additional novel volumes, an anime television series adaptation produced by Kyoto Animation, four manga series, an animated film, two original net animation series and several video games.

After the anime adaptation airing in 2006, publishing company Kadokawa Shoten received offers for licensing the novels and their adaptations. The novels are licensed for English language release in the United States by Little, Brown and Company, for young readers by Yen Press and the anime adaptation was licensed for North American distribution by Kadokawa Pictures USA division which then sub-licensed production and distribution to Bandai Entertainment. The anime is currently licensed by Crunchyroll.

Plot

Kyon is a student at North High School in Nishinomiya. He is dragged along by his classmate, Haruhi Suzumiya, an eccentric schoolgirl who seeks supernatural phenomena and figures, such as aliens, time travelers, and espers.

Haruhi soon recruits three additional members: the laconic bibliophile Yuki Nagato, the shy and timid Mikuru Asahina, and the unflappable transfer student Itsuki Koizumi. These members soon reveal themselves to Kyon to be the types of extraordinary characters that Haruhi seeks. They have been sent by their respective secret organizations to observe Haruhi—who is unaware that she possesses reality warping powers—and to prevent these powers from being unleashed. Each of the three believe that it would be dangerous were Haruhi to discover she had such powers. Together with Kyon, they work to keep life interesting for Haruhi and to prevent her from becoming bored enough to imagine a new world, as they and their organizations fear that this would destroy the current world.

Media

Light novels

Written by Nagaru Tanigawa and illustrated by Noizi Ito, the light novels alternate between full-length novels and collections of short stories and novellas that initially appeared in The Sneaker, a seinen novel magazine published by the Japanese publishing company Kadokawa Shoten. Kadokawa Shoten published 11 volumes from June 6, 2003, to May 25, 2011. In an official guidebook titled The Observation of Haruhi Suzumiya published in June 2011, Tanigawa mentioned in an interview that he had finalized the plot for at least one more volume in the series. A short story was published in a special one-time revival issue of The Sneaker on October 31, 2018. A 12th novel, The Intuition of Haruhi Suzumiya, was announced in August 2020 for release in Japan on November 25, after a 9-year break from publishing.

The novels are licensed for release in North America by Little, Brown Books for Young Readers and Yen Press. The novels will reprinted under Yen Press's Yen On imprint. They are also available in Taiwan, Hong Kong and mainland China by Kadokawa Media; in South Korea by Daiwon CI; in Spain and Argentina by Editorial Ivrea; in Italy by Edizioni BD; in Thailand by Bongkoch Books; and in Vietnam by IPM.

Manga

Kadokawa Shoten published two manga adaptations of the Haruhi Suzumiya light novel series in Shōnen Ace. The first one, by Makoto Mizuno, ran from May to December 2004 issues and was partially compiled in one volume published in August 2004. It was considerably different from the light novels, having little input from the original author. The second series, illustrated by Gaku Tsugano, ran from November 2005 and to November 2013 issues, having been published in 20 volumes, with a younger target audience than the original novels. Though mostly consisting of straight adaptations of the light novels, the manga also included 13 new stories scattered throughout, each one chapter long, and most of them spinning off of one of the light novel stories. On April 17, 2008 Yen Press announced that they had acquired the license for the North American release of the first four volumes of the second manga series, promising the manga would not be censored.

An official parody four-panel comic strip titled The Melancholy of Suzumiya Haruhi-chan by Puyo started serialization in Shōnen Ace on July 26, 2007, and in The Sneaker on August 30, 2007. It ended on December 26, 2018, and was compiled in twelve volumes. The first bound volume was released on May 26, 2008, and the last on May 1, 2019. Yen Press licensed the Haruhi-chan manga series for an English release in North America and released the first volume on October 26, 2010 and the last on May 26, 2020. Another four-panel parody manga, Nyorōn Churuya-san by Eretto (Utsura Uraraka), was originally a dōjinshi starring a smoked cheese-loving, super deformed version of Tsuruya, published in three volumes (released in August 2006, February 2007, and October 2007) before being serialized in the magazine Comp Ace between November 2008 and October 2009 issues and being released in one bound volume.

Another manga, also by Puyo, was serialized in Kadokawa Shoten's Young Ace between the July 2009 and September 2016 issues and was compiled into ten tankōbon volumes. It is set in an alternate universe of the altered timeline established in the fourth light novel, The Disappearance of Haruhi Suzumiya, where Yuki Nagato is an accident-prone video game addict as opposed to the shy bookworm of the altered timeline and the laconic alien of the original timeline. Yuki-chan has also been licensed in North America by Yen Press. Another spin-off manga by Puyo, titled , launched in the May 2012 issue of Kadokawa Shoten's Altima Ace magazine on April 18, 2012 and the fourth and last chapter was released in the November 2012 issue on October 18, 2012, the final issue of Altima Ace. The chapters were compiled in the ninth volume of The Melancholy of Suzumiya Haruhi-chan.

Anime

It was originally aired in a nonlinear order, with the prologue and first seven chapters of the first novel intermixed with chapters from some of the later novels. The "next episode" previews feature two different episode numberings: one number from Haruhi, who numbers the episodes in chronological order, and one number from Kyon, who numbered them in broadcast order. The DVD releases start with "Episode 00" and are then shown in chronological order.

The anime was licensed and distributed by Bandai Entertainment over four DVDs released between May and November 2007. A complete box set was released on July 29, 2008. It was broadcast in Italy on Rai 4 between October 24, 2010, and February 6, 2011. Each of the North American releases offered a limited edition collector's set featuring the English dub DVD in chronological order, a subbed-only disc containing the episodes in broadcast order, and an official CD release of the opening, ending, and insert songs appearing in the show.

The second season of the anime series was announced in a full-page advertisement of Asahi Shimbun on July 7, 2007, in Japan. Promotional videos included a live action sequence, inspired by the "Bamboo Leaf Rhapsody" chapter from the third novel The Boredom of Haruhi Suzumiya, depicting Haruhi and Kyon breaking into a school shown by footage taken from surveillance cameras. On December 18, 2007, the anime's official website, haruhi.tv, was replaced by a fake 404 error with five form-input fields, a reference to the pivotal date in The Disappearance of Haruhi Suzumiya, the fourth volume in the light novel series.

A re-broadcast of the first series began in April 2009. Following a comment by Teletama, one of the broadcasting stations, that the 2009 broadcast would be 28 episodes long, there was speculation that the re-broadcast would be followed by the second season, though this was not confirmed by Kadokawa at the time. The first new episode, was aired on May 21, 2009, as the eighth episode of the re-broadcast. Unlike the original run, the re-broadcast was shown in chronological order, with new episodes intermixed with the old ones. Episodes were later shown on Kadokawa's YouTube channel after the broadcast and started showing English-subtitled episodes. The second season features the controversial "Endless Eight" story arc, in which the members of the SOS Brigade are stuck in a time loop which lasts for eight episodes, each of which is practically identical. Bandai Entertainment licensed the re-broadcast in 2010 and released a complete collection in North America on September 14, 2010. Manga Entertainment released the season in a 4-disc DVD box set, including the Haruhi-chan mini-episodes, in the UK on July 4, 2011. Following the 2012 closure of Bandai Entertainment, Funimation announced at Otakon 2014 that they had licensed the anime television series. Following Sony's acquisition of Crunchyroll, the series was moved to Crunchyroll.

Spinoffs

The two series were streamed in Japanese and with English subtitles on Kadokawa's YouTube channel between February 13 and May 15, 2009. All the voice actors of the original anime reprised their roles in both series. The first DVD of the series was released in Japan on May 29, 2009, with a release on Blu-ray Disc on August 27, 2010. The series has been licensed by Bandai Entertainment and has been dubbed by Bang Zoom! Entertainment for DVD release. The first volume was released on October 5, 2010. As with the original TV anime, the two series have been re-licensed by Funimation. An anime adaptation of The Disappearance of Nagato Yuki-chan by Satelight began airing in April 2015 and is licensed by Funimation, who began streaming a broadcast dub version in May 2015.

Film

An animated film by Kyoto Animation titled  was adapted from the Haruhi Suzumiya light novel of the same name and released in Japanese theaters on February 6, 2010. It was announced via a teaser shown at the end of the 2009 re-airing of the anime. This film has also been licensed by Bandai Entertainment, who released it for the North American market on September 20, 2011.

Audio dramas

A series of radio dramas have been released. The first volume, titled SOS Dan Radio Shibu Bangai Hen CD Vol.1, is based on the anime version of the series and was released on July 5, 2006, by Lantis. The second volume was released on September 21, 2006, while a third was released on December 21, 2006. A drama CD titled Sound Around, based on the anime adaptation, was released on January 24, 2007, by Lantis.

Video games

Six video games have been produced based on the series. Namco Bandai Games released an adventure game, for the PlayStation Portable (PSP) on December 20, 2007. Banpresto released another adventure game available for the PlayStation 2 on January 31, 2008, called . It was the 95th best-selling game in Japan in 2008, selling 139,425 copies.

The third game was developed by Kadokawa Shoten for the Wii, . It was released on January 22, 2009. It was released on March 26, 2009, with the fifth game, also by Sega, released for the Nintendo DS on May 28, 2009. In February 2010 Kadokawa Shoten released The Day of Sagittarius III in Japanese and English in Apple's App Store.

Namco Bandai Games released a video game for the PlayStation 3 (PS3) and PSP titled  on May 12, 2011. The game is a sequel to The Disappearance of Haruhi Suzumiya, taking place shortly afterward. The PS3 and PSP versions sold a combined 33,784 copies in their first four days of sales. Characters from the Haruhi Suzumiya series also appear in the crossover PSP video game, Nendoroid Generation, by Namco Bandai Games, Good Smile Company and Banpresto.

ASOS Brigade
In December 2006, Bandai Entertainment registered the website asosbrigade.com. On December 22, 2006, the website opened with a live action presentation video resembling a fan-made production featuring Haruka Inoue and Akiyo Yamamoto in the roles of Mikuru Asahina and Yuki Nagato, with Haruhi Suzumiya being played by Patricia Ja Lee. The video (in Japanese) confirmed the specifics of the licensing arrangement. After a few days a subtitled version of the video replaced the original on the site, translating the Japanese licensing announcement into English. The website linked to a blog on the social networking website MySpace, which entered the list of the top 50 most viewed MySpace pages within 24 hours.

On May 30, 2007, the SOS Brigade Invasion Tour was announced for Anime Expo 2007 on June 30. Aya Hirano, Yuko Goto, and Minori Chihara were part of this event "being flown in directly from Japan". Anime Expo attendees were able to participate in the ASOS Dance Contest held on Friday and the winner would have the chance to dance on stage with the guests of honor. Ever since the event was announced, advance ticket sales for pre-registered attendees have caused AX officials to cut down on the number of tickets sold due to the overwhelming number of advance tickets sold (despite the event being free of charge to attend).

In 2010, a new set of videos were introduced to announce the second season of English dubbed episodes. These featured Cristina Vee in the role of Haruhi, Karrie Shirou in the role of Mikuru, and Gina Lee (episode 1) / Alice in the role of Yuki.

Music

The 2006 anime has two opening themes: , performed by Yuko Goto and used as the opening of episode one (sometimes called episode zero), and  performed by Aya Hirano and used in episodes two through fourteen. The main ending theme of the series was  performed by Aya Hirano, Minori Chihara and Goto which spanned the first thirteen episodes, with the fourteenth episode ending with an extended version of "It's an Adventure, Right? Right?". For the new episodes of the 2009 re-airing, the opening theme is "Super Driver" by Hirano, and the ending theme is  performed by Hirano, Chihara and Goto. The single for "Super Driver" was released on July 22, 2009, while the single for "Stop!" was released on August 26, 2009. "It's an Adventure, Right? Right?" was used as the opening theme of the film The Disappearance of Haruhi Suzumiya.

Among the insert songs used were "God Knows..." and "Lost My Music" performed by Aya Hirano in Japanese and Wendee Lee in English in episode twelve. Segments of Symphony No. 4 in F Minor composed by Pyotr Ilyich Tchaikovsky, Symphony No. 7 in C Major, "Leningrad" composed by Dmitri Shostakovich, and Daphnis et Chloé composed by Maurice Ravel were used in episode eleven, while Symphony No. 8 in E♭ Major, "Symphony of a Thousand", composed by Gustav Mahler, was used in episode fourteen.

 was a live concert event held at Omiya Sonic City on March 18, 2007, that featured songs from the anime sung by the voice actors, which was also featured in episode 15 of Lucky Star. The DVD of the concert was released on July 27, 2007. On April 29, 2009  was held in Tokyo with music by the Tokyo Philharmonic Orchestra and Philip Chu as conductor. The event featured songs and background music from the anime arranged with a classic twist. A CD of the concert was released on June 24, 2009.

A single of the two songs was released on April 20, 2009. Three singles accompanying the other spin-off ONA series, Nyoro-n Churuya-san, were released, featuring songs sung by Yuki Matsuoka.

Reception
The first novel of the series, The Melancholy of Haruhi Suzumiya was awarded the Grand Prize in the eighth annual Sneaker Awards—only the third Grand Prize given out in the Award's history. The series has become a huge success for light novels in Japan, selling over 4,300,000 copies in September 2007 and surpassed 8,000,000 copies when the tenth and eleventh volumes were released in May 2011 after the limited editions set a record 513,000 first pressing for light novels. As of 2017, 20 million copies of all versions of the light novels and manga volumes internationally are in print.

In December 2006 The Melancholy of Haruhi Suzumiya anime adaptation was the most popular anime series in Japan at that time according to Newtype USA magazine. The first two volumes had sold 70,000 and 90,000 units respectively as of August 2006. It was fifth in IGN's "Top Ten Anime of 2007" feature. A 2006 online poll of Japan's top 100 favorite animated television series of all time, conducted by TV Asahi, placed the series in fourth place. By the end of 2007 the seventh installment of the series sold 45,000 units. The anime adaptation won the Animation Kobe Award for TV Feature in 2006. At the Sixth Annual Tokyo Anime Awards, the series won the category "Best TV Anime Series" and Aya Hirano won the "Voice Acting Award." Its spin-offs, The Melancholy of Haruhi-chan Suzumiya and Nyorōn Churuya-san, won the Network award at the 14th Animation Kobe Awards.

At Anime Expo 2008, the series received several awards by the Society for the Promotion of Japanese Animation. Sugita won an award for Best Voice Actor (Japanese), Hirano for Best Voice Actress (Japanese), Kaeko Sakamoto for Best Casting Director, Shoko Ikeda for Best Character Design, Haruhi Suzumiya for Best Character Design, and "Hare Hare Yukai" for Best Original Song.

Cultural impact
The anime series became an Internet phenomenon in Japan, Asia, and English-speaking countries. Over 2,000 clips of the series and user-created parodies and homages were posted to video sharing websites such as YouTube and Nico Nico Douga. The popularity of these clips (and those of other popular Japanese series) led the Japanese Society for Rights of Authors, Composers and Publishers (JASRAC) to request that YouTube remove clips claimed to be under the copyright of their members.

The popularity of the series made Aya Hirano one of the earliest examples of the "idol voice actor" crossover in the late 2000s. Haruhi, Yuki, and Mikuru (voiced by Aya Hirano, Minori Chihara, and Yūko Gotō), along with Japanese drama actor Toma Ikuta, made their first Japanese ad appearance in promoting Lotte Acuo Gum in March 2010.

The non-chronological broadcast order of the anime inspired a math problem: "What is the fewest number of Haruhi episodes that one would have to watch in order to see the original 14 episodes in every order possible?" In 2011, efforts to solve "The Haruhi Problem" on 4chan led to a proof of the lower bound for the minimal length of superpermutations, solving what had been an open math problem since 1993.

Notes

References

External links

Haruhi Suzumiya at Kadokawa Shoten 
Official The Melancholy of Haruhi Suzumiya anime website 
The Melancholy of Haruhi Suzumiya anime  at Kyoto Animation 
Official North American manga and novels website
Haruhi Suzumiya at Madman Entertainment
 ASOSBrigade.com via the Wayback Machine

Haruhi Suzumiya
2003 Japanese novels
2004 manga
2005 comics endings
2005 manga
2013 comics endings
2006 anime television series debuts
2006 Japanese television series debuts
2006 Japanese television series endings
2007 manga
2018 comics endings
2009 comics endings
2007 video games
2008 video games
2009 anime ONAs
2009 Japanese television series debuts
2009 Japanese television series endings
Anime and manga based on light novels
Bandai Entertainment anime titles
Book series introduced in 2003
Comedy anime and manga
Crunchyroll anime
Kadokawa Dwango franchises
Kadokawa Sneaker Bunko
Kyoto Animation
Lantis (company)
Light novels
Science fiction anime and manga
Science fiction book series
School life in anime and manga
Shōnen manga
Television shows based on light novels
Yen Press titles